The 1967 All-East football team consists of American football players chosen by various selectors as the best players at each position among the Eastern colleges and universities during the 1967 NCAA University Division football season.

Offense

Quarterback
 Brian Dowling, Yale (AP-1)

Halfbacks
 Calvin Hill, Yale (AP-1)
 Vic Gatto, Harvard (AP-1)

Fullback
 Larry Csonka, Syracuse (AP-1)

Ends
 Rob Taylor, Navy (AP-1)
 Ted Kwalick, Penn State (AP-1)

Tackles
 Rich Buzin, Penn State (AP-1)
 Henry Paulson, Dartmouth (AP-1)

Guards
 Mike Donovan, Northeastern (AP-1)
 Al Bersin, Harvard (AP-1)

Center
 Bill Lenkaitis, Penn State (AP-1)

Kicker
 Nick Kurilko, Army (AP-1)

Defense

Ends
 Bill Dow, Navy (AP-1)
 Scott Lewendon, Rutgers (AP-1)

Tackles
 Ray Norton, Boston University (AP-1)
 Dennis Fitzgibbons, Syracuse (AP-1)

Middle guard
 Glenn Grieco, Holy Cross (AP-1)

Linebackers
 Bud Neswiacherry, Army (AP-1)
 Jim Bevans, Army (AP-1)
 Dennis Onkotz, Penn State (AP-1)

Backs  
 Tim Montgomery, Penn State (AP-1)
 Dick Farley, Boston University (AP-1)
 Gordie Rule, Dartmouth (AP-1)

Key
 AP = Associated Press
 UPI = United Press International

See also
 1967 College Football All-America Team

References

All-Eastern
All-Eastern college football teams